Claude Pinoteau (25 May 1925 – 5 October 2012) was a French film director and scriptwriter. Born in Boulogne-Billancourt, Hauts de Seine, Île-de-France, France. He died in Neuilly-sur-Seine, aged 87. His sister was the actress Arlette Merry.

Filmography 
 1971 : It Only Happens to Others
 1973 :  with Lino Ventura, Leo Genn et Suzanne Flon
 1974 :  with Lino Ventura, Annie Girardot et Isabelle Adjani
 1976 : Le Grand Escogriffe with Yves Montand, Agostina Belli et Claude Brasseur
 1979 : Jigsaw (L'Homme en colère) with Lino Ventura, Angie Dickinson et Donald Pleasence
 1980 : La Boum with Claude Brasseur, Brigitte Fossey et Sophie Marceau
 1982 : La Boum 2 with Claude Brasseur, Brigitte Fossey et Sophie Marceau
 1984 :  with Lino Ventura, Lea Massari et Jean Poiret
 1988 : L'Étudiante with Sophie Marceau, Vincent Lindon et Élisabeth Vitali
 1991 : La Neige et le feu with Vincent Perez, Géraldine Pailhas et Matthieu Rozé
 1994 : Cache cash with Michel Duchaussoy, Georges Wilson et Jean-Pierre Darroussin
 1997 : Les Palmes de M. Schutz with Isabelle Huppert, Philippe Noiret et Charles Berling
 2005 : Un abbé nommé Pierre, une vie pour les autres (documentary)

References

External links

1925 births
2012 deaths
People from Boulogne-Billancourt
French film directors
French male screenwriters
Commandeurs of the Ordre des Arts et des Lettres
Deaths from cancer in France